Harry Walker (1760 – July 1805) was a noted English cricketer who played mainly for Surrey sides.  He was a left-handed batsman who played first-class cricket from 1786 until 1802, making 101 appearances in first-class matches.

Walker was the elder brother of the great batsman Tom Walker. He was born at Churt, near Frensham in Surrey in 1760 and died at Brook near Witley also in Surrey in 1805.

References

English cricketers
English cricketers of 1701 to 1786
English cricketers of 1787 to 1825
Surrey cricketers
1760 births
1805 deaths
Hambledon cricketers
Hampshire cricketers
Marylebone Cricket Club cricketers
White Conduit Club cricketers
Left-Handed v Right-Handed cricketers
Surrey and Marylebone Cricket Club cricketers
West Kent cricketers
Colonel C. Lennox's XI cricketers